Bobrek is a village in Subcarpathian Voivodeship, south-east Poland, located between Dębica and Ropczyce, close to Zawada in the district called Gmina Dębica.

References

Villages in Dębica County